Jonatas Elias Belusso (born 10 June 1988) is a Brazilian footballer who plays as a striker. Belusso also carries Syrian passport.

Career 
He joined K League Challenge side Gangwon FC in February 2015 and was released at the end of the season. In February 2016 it was announced that Belusso joined K League Challenge side Seoul E-Land FC.

References

External links

1988 births
Living people
Brazilian footballers
Association football forwards
Brazilian expatriate footballers
Clube Atlético Metropolitano players
Guaratinguetá Futebol players
Esporte Clube Juventude players
Clube Náutico Capibaribe players
Esporte Clube Novo Hamburgo players
Treze Futebol Clube players
Ermis Aradippou FC players
Gangwon FC players
Seoul E-Land FC players
Grêmio Esportivo Brasil players
Brusque Futebol Clube players
Londrina Esporte Clube players
Al-Shabab FC (Riyadh) players
Esporte Clube Vitória players
Coritiba Foot Ball Club players
América Futebol Clube (MG) players
K League 2 players
Cypriot First Division players
Campeonato Brasileiro Série A players
Campeonato Brasileiro Série B players
Campeonato Brasileiro Série C players
Campeonato Brasileiro Série D players
Saudi Professional League players
Expatriate footballers in Sweden
Brazilian expatriate sportspeople in Sweden
Expatriate footballers in Cyprus
Brazilian expatriate sportspeople in Cyprus
Expatriate footballers in South Korea
Brazilian expatriate sportspeople in South Korea
Brazilian expatriate sportspeople in Saudi Arabia
Expatriate footballers in Saudi Arabia